Maya is a 2015 Pakistani horror film which was the directorial debut of Jawad Bashir and was produced by Hina Jawad under the production banner Twister Films. The film's cast included Ahmed Abdul Rehman, Hina Jawad, Zain Afzal, Sheikh Mohammad Ahmed and Anam Malik. Hina Jawad played the lead role of Maya in the film.

The film was released nationwide on 12 June 2015.

Plot 
5 friends make a plan to live in a farm house. One night they attend a party in which a brutal murder happens. Nida watching this murder is in deep shock. Later they found that the farm house is haunted. They consult a priest for exorcism.

Cast 
 Hina Jawad as Maya/Mishal
 Ahmed Abdul Rehman as Waqas
 Zain Afzal as Sam
 Anam Malik as Rida
 Rasheed Ali as Priest
 Sheikh Mohammad Ahmed as Amir
 Ali Aftab (special appearance)
 Jawad Bashir (special appearance)

Production

Marketing
A teaser trailer and poster was revealed by official Facebook on 2 May 2015. The film trailer was reviewed by DAWN.com as "Given that a good screenplay and creative cinematography couldn't save Siyaah from a poor box office performance, Maya can hardly be expected to haunt the audience."

Release 
The film had its premiere at Super Cinema in Lahore on June 11, 2015 and the film was released nationwide on the next day (June 12).

Reception

Critical response
Momin Ali Munshi of Galaxy Lollywood reviewed the film 3/5 stars and verdicts as "This horror film by Jawad Bashir should definitely be on every horror fans weekend list as it has its fair share of scares and makes for an entertaining watch."

See also 
 List of directorial debuts
 List of Pakistani films of 2015

References

External links 
 

Maya
2015 films
Horror films based on actual events
2015 horror films
Ghost films
Haunted house films
2015 directorial debut films
2010s Urdu-language films